Juvencio Osorio Maldonado (1 June 1950 – 10 March 2023) was a Paraguayan footballer who played as a central midfielder.

Career
Osorio began his football career with Cerro Porteño, where he would win three straight titles (1972–1974). Next, he moved to Spain, joining RCD Espanyol for four seasons, before returning and eventually retiring with Cerro Porteño. His nephew, Secundino Aifuch, was his teammate at Espanyol for one season in 1978–79.

Honours
Cerro Porteño
 Paraguayan Primera División: 1970, 1972, 1973, 1974

Paraguay
 Copa América: 1979

References

External links

1950 births
2023 deaths
Sportspeople from Asunción
Paraguayan footballers
Association football midfielders
Paraguay international footballers
Copa América-winning players
1979 Copa América players
La Liga players
Cerro Porteño players
RCD Espanyol footballers
Paraguayan expatriate footballers
Paraguayan expatriate sportspeople in Spain
Expatriate footballers in Spain